Canción Andaluza (English: Andalusian Song) is the final studio album by Spanish musician Paco de Lucía, released on April 29, 2014 through Universal Music Spain. It was released posthumously after his death on February 25, 2014 and features collaborations with Oscar D'León, Estrella Morente and Vicente Castro "Parrita". 

The album was recorded at his studio in Mallorca, Spain. The production of the album appeared in the 2014 documentary film Paco de Lucía: La Búsqueda, directed by Francisco Sánchez Varela.

At the 15th Annual Latin Grammy Awards, the album won Album of the Year, becoming the first flamenco music album to win the award, also the album won Best Flamenco Album, being the third time he wins that category after receiving the award for Cositas Buenas in 2004 and En Vivo Conciertos España 2010 in 2012.

Track listing
All tracks were produced by Paco de Lucía.

Charts

Weekly charts

Year-end charts

Certifications

References

2014 albums
Paco de Lucía albums
Flamenco albums
Latin Grammy Award for Best Flamenco Album
Albums published posthumously
Latin Grammy Award winners for Album of the Year